All God's Chillun Got Wings may refer to:
 "All God's Chillun Got Wings" (song) a negro spiritual
 All God's Chillun Got Wings (play), a 1924 play by Eugene O'Neill